Lozan Vladimirov Kotsev (8 February 1911 - 14 June 1991) was a Bulgarian football manager who was last known to have managed Beroe.

Career

Playing career

Kotsev started his playing career with Bulgarian side FK 13. After that, he signed for Lausanne-Sport in Switzerland, becoming the first Bulgarian to play abroad and helping them win the league title.

Managerial career

In 1960, Kotsev was appointed manager of Bulgarian club Cherno More. After that, he was appointed manager of Sudan. In 1972, he was appointed manager of Beroe in Bulgaria.

References

Bulgarian footballers
Association football forwards
1911 births
1991 deaths
Expatriate footballers in Switzerland
Bulgarian football managers
Expatriate football managers in Sudan
Footballers from Sofia
Bulgaria international footballers
PFC Cherno More Varna managers
PFC Beroe Stara Zagora managers
Sudan national football team managers
Singapore national football team managers
Bulgarian expatriate football managers
1963 African Cup of Nations managers